The Synthetic Gene Database (SGDB) is a database of artificially engineered genes.

See also
 Gene

References

Genetics databases
Gene expression
Chemical synthesis
Molecular genetics
Protein biosynthesis
Genetically modified organisms
Synthetic biology